Ismail Siddique, popularly known as Bagh Hazarika, was a 17th-century warrior who fought against the Mughals for the Ahom kingdom. He is culturally represented as "Hero of Indigenous Muslim Communities in Assam".  He was born in an Assamese Muslim family at Dhekerigaon village near Garhgaon in Assam

Legend
The legend around his origins states that there was once a tiger that had entered his village and Ismail Siddique, who was unarmed, killed the tiger barehanded. The news of this valour reached the Ahom king Chakradhwaj Singha and he called the young man to his court to display his strength. The king was impressed by the show of strength and appointed Ismail as a Hazarika, an Ahom office in charge of 1000 paiks. This event marks the beginning of the legend of the brave Bagh ("Tiger" in Assamese language) Hazarika that culminated in his acts of bravery during Battle of Saraighat.

Military career

In this first conflict, the Mughal forces were well entrenched on the hills of the north bank of the Brahmaputra river with a chain of gigantic cannons. Bagh Hazarika suggested a plan on how to disable the Mughal guns to the Ahom General Lachit Borphukan, the royal minister Atan Burhagohain and other generals. Impressed by the plan, they entrusted Bagh Hazarika with command to lead the operation.

That night an advance party led by Bagh Hazarika along with a few soldiers crossed the Brahmaputra by boat and landed on the northern bank of the river and laid in wait for the right moment. While the Mughal soldiers were busy saying their Fajr or dawn prayers, Bagh Hazarika and his soldiers climbed the high embankments and poured water into the Mughal cannons, rendering them useless.

Some time later, the Ahom army announced their advance by blowing the trumpets. In response, the Mughal soldiers rushed to their posts and tried to fire the cannons at the advancing Ahom forces. But, the wet cannons would not work. The Ahom forces used their cannons to the full strength and the Ahom army landed safely on the north bank and attacked ferociously as the Mughal soldiers retreated helplessly.

This victory had proved the courage and valour of Bagh Hazarika beyond any doubt and he was felicitated by the King. Bagh Hazarika thus went down in the annals of Assam history as a highly skilled front ranking military officer.

References

Military personnel from Assam
17th-century soldiers